While the modern novel format dates back at least as far as the 18th century, novels dealing with desire or relationships between men were rare during the early part of the 20th century, and nearly non-existent before then, due to the taboo nature of homosexuality at the time. Many early novels depicting (or even alluding to) homosexuality were published anonymously or pseudonymously, or like Maurice, sat unpublished until after the death of the author, reflecting authors' fear of opprobrium, censorship, or legal prosecution.

Works which are widely labeled "gay novels" generally feature overt gay attraction or relationships as central concerns. In some cases, the label may be applied to early novels which merely contain homosexual allusions or subtext, such as Oscar Wilde's The Picture of Dorian Gray. Works that feature only minor gay characters or scenes, such as the 1748 erotic novel Fanny Hill, are not included in this list.

Many authors of early gay novels were themselves gay or bisexual men, such as Oscar Wilde, Gore Vidal, and James Baldwin. Others were heterosexual, or of unknown identity, writing under a pseudonym. One popular and influential writer of early gay novels, Mary Renault, was a lesbian woman.

Through the second half of the 20th century, as homosexuality became more visible and less taboo, gay themes came to appear more frequently in fiction. This list includes only novels written (though not necessarily published) before 1969, the year of the Stonewall riots, which are widely seen as a turning point in the gay rights movement. Gay plays such as Frank Marcus's The Killing of Sister George do not fit the definition of novel.

Identity of the first gay novel
Owing to varying criteria for what it means for a novel to be 'gay' (and, moreover, varying criteria for what makes a work of fiction a novel), there is no single work which is widely agreed to be the first gay novel. In 2014, the magazine The Gay & Lesbian Review Worldwide conducted a reader survey seeking to identify the first gay novel. E.M. Forster's Maurice (written in 1913) received a plurality of 29% of votes. The next most popular selections were The City and the Pillar and The Picture of Dorian Gray, but votes were widely dispersed.

Novels

See also

 Gay literature
 List of LGBT-themed speculative fiction
 Lists of LGBT figures in fiction and myth
 List of lesbian fiction

Notes

References

Bibliography 

 

gay novels prior to the Stonewall riots
LGBT-related lists